The 2022–23 Cal State Bakersfield Roadrunners men's basketball team represents California State University, Bakersfield in the 2022–23 NCAA Division I men's basketball season. The Roadrunners, led by 12th-year head coach Rod Barnes, play their home games at Icardo Center in Bakersfield, California as members of the Big West Conference.

Previous season
The Roadrunners finished the 2021–22 season 8–19, 2–12 in Big West play to finish tied for ninth place. As the No. 9 seed, they defeated No. 8 seed Cal State Northridge in the first round of the Big West tournament, before falling to top-seeded Long Beach State in the quarterfinals.

Roster

Schedule and results

|-
!colspan=12 style=| Exhibition

|-
!colspan=12 style=| Non-conference regular season

|-
!colspan=12 style=| Big West regular season

|-
!colspan=12 style=| Big West tournament

Sources

References

Cal State Bakersfield Roadrunners men's basketball seasons
Cal State Bakersfield Roadrunners
Cal State Bakersfield Roadrunners men's basketball
Cal State Bakersfield Roadrunners men's basketball